Roy George Corhan (October 21, 1887 – November 24, 1958) was a shortstop in Major League Baseball. He played for the Chicago White Sox and St. Louis Cardinals.

References

External links

1887 births
1958 deaths
Major League Baseball shortstops
Chicago White Sox players
St. Louis Cardinals players
Baseball players from Indianapolis
Pueblo Indians players
St. Joseph Drummers players
San Francisco Seals (baseball) managers
San Francisco Seals (baseball) players